Thomas Demakos (died February 22, 2022) was an American judge. He was a justice of the New York State Supreme Court.

References 

1920s births
2022 deaths
20th-century American lawyers
21st-century American lawyers
New York Supreme Court Justices
Year of birth uncertain